Luis Eleuterio Tiant Bravo (August 27, 1906 – December 10, 1976) was a pitcher in Negro league baseball, as well as Cuba, the Dominican Republic, and Mexico. He also performed with barnstorming teams. 
Tiant's career extended from 1926 through 1948. In the Negro leagues, he played for the Havana Red Sox, Cuban Stars West, Cuban House of David/Pollock's Cuban Stars, and New York Cubans, between 1928 and 1947.

Tiant featured a screwball. Bill James and Rob Neyer ranked it the seventh-best screwball of all time.

Tiant's son, Luis Clemente Tiant, was a major league starting pitcher from 1964 to 1982. In August 1975, the elder Tiant and his wife were granted permission by Cuban leader Fidel Castro to visit the United States, so they could watch their son pitch in the major leagues. The Tiants' visit to the US is featured in the 2009 documentary film about their son, The Lost Son of Havana. The Tiants remained in the US, and the elder Luis Tiant died 16 months later in Milton, Massachusetts. He was often referred to as "Luis Tiant Sr." by contemporary press to differentiate him from his son.

References

Further reading

External links
 and Baseball-Reference Black Baseball stats and Seamheads

1906 births
1976 deaths
Baseball players from Havana
Cuban House of David players
Cuban Stars (West) players
New York Cubans players
Pollock's Cuban Stars players
Cuban emigrants to the United States